Howard the Duck, also known as Howard the Duck: Adventure on Volcano Island, is an action video game released in 1986 by Activision for the ZX Spectrum, Commodore 64 and Apple II. The game is a tie-in to the film Howard the Duck from the same year.

Gameplay
The game involves players controlling Howard the Duck to save his best friends, Phil and Beverly. After being parachuted to Volcano Island, Howard needs to find a backpack to proceed with the search. The game consists then of four levels, in the last of which Howard, armed with a neutron gun, will finally face Overlord.

Reception
Like the film, the game also received fairly negative reviews. Computer Gamer gave an overall 55%, by stating "beautifully presented, and well-programmed, it rates as one of Activision's better recent releases and deserves consideration outside its unfortunate tie-in", predicting, however, low longevity. Aktueller Software Markt described the game as not fulfilling the expectancies and not worth the money.

References

External links
Howard the Duck at IGN
Howard the Duck at MobyGames

1986 video games
Activision beat 'em ups
Action video games
Amstrad CPC games
Apple II games
Commodore 64 games
MSX games
Superhero video games
Video games scored by Russell Lieblich
Video games developed in the United Kingdom
ZX Spectrum games
Video games about birds
Video games based on Marvel Comics films
Video games based on films
Video games based on adaptations
Video games set on fictional islands
Alternative Software games